Argov is a surname. Notable people with the surname include:

Meir Argov (1905–63), Russian Empire-born Israeli Zionist activist and politician
Sasha Argov (1914–95), Russian-born Israeli composer
Shlomo Argov (1929–2003), Israeli diplomat
Zohar Argov (1955–87), Israeli singer